Sierra Norte may refer to:

 Mexico:
Sierra Norte de Puebla, in the state of Puebla
Sierra Norte de Oaxaca, in the state of Oaxaca

 Spain: 
 Sierra Norte de Sevilla, a mountain range of the Sierra Morena system
 Parque Natural Sierra Norte de Sevilla
 Sierra Norte, Guadalajara, a comarca in the province of Guadalajara
 Sierra Norte, Jaén, a comarca in the province of Jaén
 Sierra Norte, Madrid, a comarca near Madrid
 Sierra Norte Comarca, Sevilla, a comarca in the province of Seville